Craig Mazin (born April 8, 1971) is an American screenwriter and film director. He is best known for creating the HBO miniseries Chernobyl, based on the Soviet nuclear disaster of the same name in 1986, and co-creating the HBO series The Last Of Us, based on the video game of the same name created by Neil Druckmann. His work earned him two Primetime Emmy Awards, including Outstanding Writing for a Limited Series, Movie, or Dramatic Special and Outstanding Limited Series. Mazin is also known for his extensive work on the comedy genre, namely Scary Movie 3, Scary Movie 4,  Superhero Movie, Identity Thief, and the two sequels to The Hangover Trilogy.

Biography
Mazin was born in Brooklyn, New York, to an Ashkenazi Jewish family. He was raised on Staten Island, New York. He moved to Marlboro Township, New Jersey when he was a teen and attended Freehold High School which inducted him into its Hall of Fame in 2010.

Mazin graduated magna cum laude with a degree in psychology from Princeton University in 1992. His freshman-year roommate at Princeton was Ted Cruz, now the junior U.S. senator from Texas and a former Republican candidate for the 2016 presidential election year. He openly despises Cruz on a personal level and frequently disparages him on Twitter, calling the U.S. senator "a huge asshole".

Mazin is married with two children. He supported Democratic candidate Hillary Clinton in the run-up for the 2016 U.S. presidential election.

Career 
Mazin began his entertainment career as a marketing executive with Walt Disney Pictures in the mid-1990s, where he was responsible for writing and producing campaigns for studio films.

He made his screenwriting debut with 1997's sci-fi comedy RocketMan, co-written with then-writing partner Greg Erb. He has since written movies such as Senseless, Scary Movie 3, Scary Movie 4 and Identity Thief.

Mazin has directed two films: 2000's low-budget superhero film The Specials, which he also produced, and the 2008 superhero spoof Superhero Movie, which he also wrote (he also made a cameo appearance in this movie as a janitor).

Since 2006, Mazin has collaborated with director Todd Phillips on several occasions. Mazin co-wrote both Hangover sequels, parts II and III, and executive produced School for Scoundrels.

In 2004, Mazin was elected to the board of directors of the Writers Guild of America, West. He did not seek re-election, and his term expired in September 2006.

Along with fellow former WGA board member Ted Elliott, Mazin ran a website called The Artful Writer, which focused on issues relevant to working screenwriters. It closed in 2011, after seven years.

In 2011, Mazin and fellow screenwriter John August began Scriptnotes, a weekly podcast on the craft of screenwriting and the film industry.

In July 2017, HBO and Sky Television announced Chernobyl, a five-part miniseries from Mazin about the infamous nuclear disaster in Chernobyl, Ukrainian SSR, Soviet Union. The series was filmed in Lithuania and Ukraine. Mazin said that the "lesson of Chernobyl isn’t that modern nuclear power is dangerous. The lesson is that lying, arrogance, and suppression of criticism are dangerous."

In an interview with Decider, Mazin said: "If I came to HBO and said ‘I want to do another season of Chernobyl, except it’s gonna be about another terrible tragedy,’ whether it's Bhopal or Fukushima or something like that, I would imagine they at least would give me polite interest."

In October of 2019 Disney hired Craig Mazin for writing the screenplay of Pirates of the Caribbean 6 with Ted Elliott that now is currently in development. 

Mazin was named as the current scriptwriter for the Lionsgate film adaption of the Borderlands video game series in February 2020, as well as co-writer and co-executive producer for a television series adaption of the video game The Last of Us for HBO in March 2020. The Last of Us adaptation was greenlit by HBO in November 2020, and was released in January 2023. More recently, Mazin signed an overall deal with HBO.

Filmography

Film

Executive producer
 School for Scoundrels (2006)

Special thanks
 The Words (2012)
 Free Birds (2013)
 Don't Think Twice (2016)

Television

Acting credits

References

External links

1971 births
20th-century American male writers
21st-century American male writers
American male screenwriters
American podcasters
Freehold High School alumni
Princeton University alumni
Jewish American screenwriters
Living people
People from Marlboro Township, New Jersey
People from Staten Island
Primetime Emmy Award winners
Screenwriters from New York (state)
Screenwriters from New Jersey
Writers from Brooklyn
20th-century American writers
Showrunners
21st-century American Jews
American Ashkenazi Jews